Gaolbreak is a 1962 British crime film directed by Francis Searle and starring Peter Reynolds, Avice Landone and Carol White.

Plot 
A family of thieves plan a jewellery store robbery. One of them is the safecracking expert, and when he is arrested and jailed, they spring him from prison so he can take part in the job.

Production 
The film was made by Butcher's Film Service, which specialised in producing low-budget supporting films. It was shot at Twickenham Studios in West London, and on location. A collection of then-and-now location stills and corresponding contemporary photographs is hosted at reelstreets.com. The film's sets were designed by the art director Duncan Sutherland.

Cast
 Peter Reynolds as Eddie Wallis 
 Avice Landone as Mrs. Wallis 
 David Kernan as Len Rogerson 
 Carol White as Carol Marshall 
 John Blythe as Slim 
 David Gregory as Ron Wallis 
 Robert Desmond as Page 
 Stewart Guidotti as John 
 Geoffrey Hibbert as Dr. Cambus 
 Robert Fyfe as Wally 
 Carl Bernard as Inspector Brand 
 Katharine Page as Mrs. Harris 
 Sidney Vivian as Mr. Marshall 
 Marianne Stone as Mrs. Marshall 
 Ivor Dean as Barrington 
 André Mikhelson as Martinetti
 Middleton Woods as Jonah 
 Reginald Hearne as Auctioneer 
 Edward Ogden as Det. Sgt. Johnson 
 Frank Hawkins as Prison Officer 
 Neil Wilson as Beat PC 
 Jack Taylor as Uniformed Policeman 
 John H. Watson as 2nd Uniformed Policeman 
 Michael Beint as 2nd Prison Officer 
 Laurie Leigh as Shirley 
 Angela Ramsden as Hazel

References

Bibliography
 Chibnall, Steve & Murphy, Robert. British Crime Cinema. Routledge, 2005.

External links

1962 films
British crime films
1962 crime films
Films set in England
Films directed by Francis Searle
Films shot at Twickenham Film Studios
Butcher's Film Service films
1960s English-language films
1960s British films